Fabio Ricci (born 11 July 1994) is an Italian volleyball player for Bunge Ravenna and the Italian national team.

He participated at the 2017 Men's European Volleyball Championship.

References

External links
 

1994 births
Living people
Italian men's volleyball players
People from Faenza
Volleyball players at the 2015 European Games
European Games competitors for Italy
Universiade medalists in volleyball
Universiade gold medalists for Italy
Medalists at the 2019 Summer Universiade
Sportspeople from the Province of Ravenna